= CWBL =

CWBL is an acronym which may refer to:

- California Women's Baseball League of California
- Chicago Women's Baseball League of Chicago, Illinois
- Canadian Wheelchair Basketball League a Wheelchair basketball league
- Centre for Work Based Learning at Cardiff Metropolitan University
- Coloma Way Branch Library in Roseville, California
- Country-Wide Basketball League in the Philippines
